Manzil is a TV serial about a girl living in hostel far away from
hometown and falls in love with a boy. The serial is directed by Kamran Qureshi, written by Zubair Abbasi and produced by Humayun Saeed & Abdullah Kadwani's production house 7th Sky Entertainment.

The English title of the serial is Lost Destination and it was broadcast on ARY TV.  Manzil is an intense drama about a girl's courage, determination and convictions of her heart.

Plot
Somia (Savera Nadeem) belongs to a wealthy family from valley of Swat and is the only child of her parents. She is studying in university and lives in a hostel in Karachi.

One of her class fellows, Sajid (Adnan Siddiqui), falls in love with her, but she thinks him as a very good friend. She herself is in love with Mehroze (Nabeel), who is a son of feudal lord.

Somia and Mehroze quietly marry without bringing in the knowledge of her or Mehroz's parents and Somia gets pregnant. Sanwal (Aslam Sheikh), who is Mehroze's cousin, murders him due to enmity on the issues of properties.

Somia's father Sajjad Khan (Khayyam Sarhadi) and mother Mahjabeen (Deeba) accept the proposal of Yawar (Asad Malik) for her. They fix the wedding date and calls Somia to come back as she is about to finish her studies being in the final year.

Somia gives birth to a baby girl and leaves her new born with her friend Sajid and promises to come back to take her daughter back. She speaks to her mother and refuses for the marriage but her mum does not listen to her refusal and tells her that she will get killed by her father if she refused.

Somia gets married again with Yawar this time. Sajid sets off for Swat with the baby. When he arrives Somia's home asks about her, he is told that she got married few days back. When asked about the baby, by Somia's father, he tells that it is his own baby. Sajid leaves taking baby with him.

Somia has a son called Shabi (Ali Kazmi). Sajid never gets married, brings up Sobia (Faiza Hasan) and tells her that her mother died long ago. He has close relations with his friend Hashmi (Rashid Farooqi) and his wife Mehnaz, whilst their son Farzan (Kamran Jillani) is a good friend of Faiza.

Faiza accidentally comes across with Somia on airport one day when she recognizes her because she has a big portrait of Somia hanged in her home. She is shocked to see Somia. Somia becomes psycho patient and eventually dies. Sajid can't bear this loss again and dies right after her death.

Cast

Main cast 
 Adnan Siddiqui as Sajid
 Savera Nadeem as Somia
 Nabeel Zafar as Mehroz Shahani
 Asad Malik as Yawar Khan
 Zaheen Tahira as Hani
 Khayyam Sarhadi as Sajjad Khan
 Deeba as Mahjabeen
 Azra Aftab as Khanam
 Rasheed Naz as Hayat Khan
 Ali Kazmi as Shabi
 Faiza Hasan as Sobia
 Kamran Jillani as Farzan Hashmi

Recurring cast 
 Rashid Farooqi as Hashmi
 Farah Nadeem as Mehnaz
 Aslam Sheikh as Sanwal
 Yar Muhammad Shah as Gohram Shahani
 Manzoor Murad as Rustam
 Ghazala Javed as Salma
 Gaysoo as Nabeela
 Seema Nasir as Maggi
 Kulsum Sultan

Soundtrack

The theme song Ye Unchi Nechi Manzilein was composed by Waqar Ali and sung by Tina Sani. Lyricist was M Nasir and music video was released in 2006.

See also
 Moorat
 Riyasat
 Makan
 Sarkar Sahab
 Ishq Ki Inteha
 Choti Si Kahani

References

External links
 
 Director's Website
 Tina Sani & Waqar Ali's interview
 Adnan Siddiqui's interview
 Sawera Nadeem & Asad Malik on location
 Khayyam Sarhadi on location
 The Making Show

ARY Digital
Urdu-language television shows
Urdu-language television
Pakistani drama television series
2014 Pakistani television series debuts
Serial drama television series
2015 Pakistani television series endings
7th Sky Entertainment
ARY Digital original programming